Mount Tomuraushi may refer to:
 Mount Tomuraushi (Daisetsuzan), in Daisetsuzan National Park in Hokkaidō
 Mount Tomuraushi (Hidaka), in the Hidaka Mountains of Hokkaido